Seidenbusch is a German surname and may refer to 

Johann Georg Seidenbusch (1641–1729), Bavarian priest 
Rupert Seidenbusch (1830–1895), German-American priest

See also
 Seipenbusch